Vacationland is a stand-up comedy series starring American author, actor, and humorist John Hodgman. Vacationland played in fifteen different cities, debuting on September 12, 2015 at the Wilbur Theatre in Boston, Massachusetts and ending on November 7, 2015 at Ohio University in Athens, Ohio with The Daily Show correspondent Jordan Klepper.

Premise 
Vacationland is a 75-minute one-person show presented by comedian John Hodgman. It is named after Maine's current nickname.

Concert tour industry trade publication Pollstar noted in Vacationlands press release the topics that will be discussed as "how the people of various rural towns are probably planning to sacrifice you to their god," "[Hodgman's] exile to the state of Maine, home to the world's most painful beaches," and "the evolutionary purpose of the weird dad mustache."

Tour dates 
Initially, Vacationland was set to play in twelve cities. However, three more cities were added to the tour. After the publication of a Bangor Daily News interview with John Hodgman, a Portland, Maine tour date was added. Two previews of the show in Brooklyn, New York sold out.

Reception 
Exclaim!s Anthony Damiao said "Hodgman was the personification of patience; bearded and looking something like a high school guidance counsellor nearing retirement. He was sedate, measured and collected — imagine NPR on stage, with glasses."

References

External links 
John Hodgman Tour Dates

Comedy tours